Caughnawaga is a former town in then Tryon County, later Montgomery County, New York, United States.

Caughnawaga is believed to be a Mohawk language word meaning "at the rapids", referring to the site along  the Mohawk River. It was the name of a Mohawk village nearby that was occupied from 1666 to 1693, when it was destroyed by French colonists. Today the Caughnawaga Indian Village Site is a state-recognized archeological site. 

French Jesuits established a mission there, which operated for about 10 years ranging from 1668 to 1679; they taught some of the Mohawk to read and write in French, as well as teaching them about Christianity (Roman Catholicism). Scholars believe that the village known as "Caughnawaga" was first located upstream until 1679 at what is now known as the "Fox Farm site". The French attacked the site in retaliation for other deaths, and the Mohawk moved it to this location. Archeologist Dean Snow gives a population estimate of around 300 people, fewer than had lived at the Fox Farm site due to the departure of converted Catholic Mohawk to Canada by 1679.

The French and other European settlers began to apply the term Caughnawaga to the mostly Mohawk people who lived in the area of the Lachine Rapids on the St. Lawrence River.  They were also called the "Praying Indians", as they were Mohawk who had converted to Roman Catholicism, under the influence of Jesuit French missionaries. 

Numerous Mohawk were still living in this area at the time when the Dutch colonists formed an early settlement near the present village of Fonda, New York and called it Caughnawaga.

Before 1788, the British and later Americans had classified all land in the county north and south of the Mohawk River as the district or town of Mohawk.  In 1788, the land north of the river became organized as the Town of Caughnawaga, named after the Dutch settlement.

After the Town of Caughnawaga was divided in 1793, it no longer existed in name.  The towns of Amsterdam, and the Fulton County towns of Broadalbin, Johnstown, and Mayfield were created from the former territory of Caughnawaga.

References

Former towns in New York (state)
1788 establishments in New York (state)